The 2005 LSU Tigers football team represented Louisiana State University in the 2005 NCAA Division I-A football season. Coached by Les Miles in his first season at LSU, the Tigers played their home games at Tiger Stadium in Baton Rouge, Louisiana.  Despite all of the distractions from Hurricane Katrina, LSU finished its season with an 11–2 record capped off by a 40–3 victory over No. 9 Miami in the 2005 Peach Bowl without starting quarterback JaMarcus Russell.

Schedule

Roster

Game summaries

Florida

Source: ESPN

LSU Tigers in the 2006 National Football League Draft 

https://www.pro-football-reference.com/draft/2006.htm

LSU Tigers in the 2006 Canadian Football League Draft 

https://archive.today/20130628050643/http://cfl.ca/canadian_draft/list?year=2006&team=

References

LSU
LSU Tigers football seasons
Peach Bowl champion seasons
LSU Tigers football